The Kyrie–Gloria Mass for double choir, BWV Anh. 167, is a mass composition in G major by an unknown composer. The work was likely composed in the last quarter of the 17th century. The composition has two sections, a Kyrie and a Gloria, each subdivided in three movements. It has twenty-two parts for performers: twelve parts for singers, and ten for instrumentalists, including strings, wind instruments and organ. Johann Sebastian Bach may have encountered the work around 1710, when he was employed in Weimar. In the 1730s he produced a manuscript copy of the Mass.

The Mass played an important role in Bach reception of the early 19th century; at the time it was published and performed as one of the composer's significant works. Scholarship published in the second half of the 19th century contested the work's attribution to Bach, proposing Antonio Lotti, or alternatively Johann Ludwig Bach, as possible composer of the work. In the 20th-century Bach-Werke-Verzeichnis (BWV), it was initially listed as a composition spuriously attributed to Bach, while later being classified as a doubtful composition by the composer. The work was recorded in the 21st century, and, in scholarship, Christoph Bernhard, Johann Philipp Krieger or David Pohle were mentioned as its possible composer.

History

The Kyrie–Gloria Mass for double choir, BWV Anh. 167, BNB I/An/3, was likely composed in the last quarter of the 17th century. The oldest extant source of its music is a manuscript score dating from the 1730s, which was partially written by Johann Sebastian Bach.

Weimar
Peter Wollny assumes that a copy of the work may have been brought back from the Spanish Netherlands by Ernest Augustus of Saxe-Weimar in 1707. A year later, he employed Bach for his court in Weimar. When Bach left the duchy of Saxe-Weimar in 1717, he may have taken performance parts of the Mass with him, leaving the score from which he had derived these in Weimar.

Bach's manuscript
Bach's extant manuscript of the Mass originated in the 1730s: the copy is a score likely derived from performance parts. The first part of the manuscript was written by one of Bach's scribes, who started the copy around 1732–35, while Bach himself completed the handwritten score around 1738–39. The faded original header of the manuscript carries no (clearly discernible) composer indication. The indication "J. S. Bach" found in the header is a later addition. Bach's copy is classified as Mus.ms. Bach P 659 at the Berlin State Library. It is considered an original source in Bach scholarship.

Authorship
Up to the middle of the 19th century Bach was seen as the composer of the work. In the second half of that century, Johann Sebastian's authorship was rejected, or at least questioned, in scholarship, and Antonio Lotti and Johann Ludwig Bach were mentioned as possible composers of the Mass. By the end of the 20th century, the same two composers were still mentioned as the possible authors of the work. In the 21st century, Christoph Bernhard (1628–1692), Johann Philipp Krieger (1649–1725) or David Pohle (1624–1695) were mentioned as probable composers of the work, indicating that the work was likely composed in the last quarter of the 17th century.

Structure and scoring
The Mass BWV Anh. 167 consists of two sections: a Kyrie and a Gloria, and is thus a Missa brevis in a format customary of 17th- and 18th-century Protestantism. All movements of the composition are in G major. Except for the wind instruments, written down in B-flat major, the score is notated in G Mixolydian:

The monumental work is written for double choir, consisting of two groups of SATB singers, and each of these groups of singers are accompanied by a group of instrumentalists, with the instrumentalist groups each consisting of five independent voices:
 Choir I: SATB singers and a string ensemble consisting of two parts for violins, two parts for violas, and one part for violone.
 Choir II, consisting of:
 SATB singers, three oboes (in A), a taille (in A) and violone/basso continuo.
 SATB  singers and organ.
The  singers and organ are sometimes seen as a separate choir: some of the older descriptions of the Mass refer to it as a Mass for triple choir. According to Johann Kirnberger, the  voices double melody lines of other singers, with there thus being no independent voices: they provide variety and are intended as a reinforcement of the second choir. According to the same author, the B-flat major key signature for the oboe parts implies that the intended instruments for these parts are in fact oboes d'amore. According to Wollny, the wind instruments in the original 17th-century composition were likely cornetts and trombones, with the transcription of the music for these instruments to oboes and taille being due to Bach.

Kyrie
The Kyrie of the Mass has the usual subdivisions:
 Kyrie I:  (adagio – presto).
 Christe:  (allabreve).
 Kyrie II: .

Gloria
The eldest extant manuscript of the Mass has no written out intonation for the "Gloria in excelsis Deo" opening words of the Gloria (indicated as "Gloria tacet" in the manuscript), thus the music starts with "Et in terra pax". The music of the Gloria section has these subdivisions:
 Et in terra pax: .
 Gratias agimus tibi: .
 Domine Deus:  (adagio).

Reception
Several copies of the Kyrie–Gloria Mass for double choir were manufactured in the second half of the 18th century. As far as extant, these indicate Bach as its composer. Kirnberger, who had been a student of Bach, saw great qualities in the composition:
A further manuscript copy of the Mass was produced around 1800.

First half of the 19th century
The Mass played a significant role in Bach reception of the early 19th century, when it was seen as one of his main works. In his biography of Bach, Johann Nikolaus Forkel listed the work among Bach's vocal compositions:A few years later, in March 1805, the Mass was performed as Bach's in the Gewandhaus in Leipzig. Although the title suggests that Johann Gottfried Schicht, the editor of this publication, closely followed the P 659 manuscript, he amended it in several ways, including:
 The figuration of the basso continuo was completed where lacking in the original manuscript.
 Parts for bassoon complemented and/or replaced parts written for other instruments in both choirs.
 A Gloria intonation, based on the opening measures of the Kyrie, was inserted as a replacement of the "Gloria tacet" opening of the Gloria section.

In 1812, Danish composer Peter Grønland produced performance material for the Mass, apparently based on the 1805 print. Around 1821–30, Carl Friedrich Zelter produced a copy, with his own modifications, of the Mass: this score, once in the archive of the Berliner Singakademie, went missing in the Second World War. Carl L. Hilgenfeld listed the Mass as a composition by Bach in his 1850 biography of the composer.

Second half of the 19th century
In 1858, the Bach Gesellschaft considered whether the work should be included in their edition of the complete works of Bach (BGA). Wilhelm Rust explains, in his preface to Vol. 11.1 of that edition, why he considers the work inauthentic, despite Kirnberger's favourable testimony:In 1865, Karl Hermann Bitter suggested Lotti as composer of the work. 15 years later, Philipp Spitta did the same, although, according to this author, the style of the work is not completely compatible with Lotti's and he thinks it may, alternatively, have been composed by another Italian, or by a German composer writing in the Italian style. In 1894 Alfred Dörffel returned to the issue in a BGA preface, suggesting Johann Ludwig Bach as possible composer of the work. Also the volume with which the BGA closes in 1899 mentions the work in its preface, which was written by Hermann Kretzschmar, reconfirming that the work can not be attributed to Johann Sebastian.

20th century
In 1920, Charles Sanford Terry wrote that it was generally held that the Mass was not by Bach, asserting that it had been attributed to Johann Ludwig Bach. Wolfgang Schmieder followed Dörffel's and Kretzschmar's judgements about the inauthenticity of the work in his 1950 first edition of the Bach-Werke-Verzeichnis (BWV), where it is classified as No. 167 in the third Anhang, that is the Annex of spurious works, hence its full BWV number: BWV Anh. III 167. In his 1990 second edition of the BWV, Schmieder kept the work listed in Anh. III. According to Schmieder the work is attributed to Johann Ludwig Bach or Antonio Lotti.

In the 1998 edition of the BWV (known as BWV2a), edited by Alfred Dürr and Yoshitake Kobayashi, the positions of several doubtful and spurious works were reshuffled in the  sections, following a new methodology explained in the preface of this edition. For , this meant that it was repositioned in Anh. II, that is the  section of the doubtful works, instead of formerly in Anh. III (spurious works). Like its predecessor, the BGA, also the New Bach Edition (NBE) decided, in the second half of the 20th century, not to include  in its publication of all works by Johann Sebastian Bach. In the Critical Commentary of the ninth volume of its second series (Masses, Passions, Oratorios),  describes the Mass.

21st century
The  in G major, is included, with a recording time of 13:31, in Apocryphal Bach Masses II, cpo 777561-2, by Wolfgang Helbich conducting the Alsfelder Vokalensemble (recorded 2009, released 2012). In 2014, this recording was re-issued in the eight CD Box The Sacred Apocryphal Bach. In the Bach-Jahrbuch of 2015, Wollny published an article detailing some particulars of the composition, including a tentative attribution of the composition to Bernhard, Krieger or Pohle.

References

Sources

By title

By author

 
 
 
 
 
  Preface in English and German.
 
 
 
 
 
 
 
  MDZ: bsb11131456

Further reading
 

Masses (music)
Bach: spurious and doubtful works